Kravga (or Gravga) Bridge is a historical bridge in Mersin Province, Turkey

Geography

The bridge is in Göksu town which is in Mut district of Mersin Province. At  it is on the road to west and over Göksu River.

History
It was constructed by the Karamanids, a Turkmen principality which ruled in the 13th-15th centuries. (see Anatolian beyliks) According to Turkish General Directorate of Highways, they either fully constructed or used the foundations of a former bridge ruin (which was probably an early Roman bridge)  This second hypothesis is supported by the fact that the masonry of the lower part of the arches and the rest of the bridge are different. The bridge was active till 1990.

Construction
The bridge is an arch type bridge. There are three arches. But they are not symmetrical. One side arch is smaller than the other. The total length of the bridge is  There are two discharging cells and several open-spandrels which are thought to balance the weight.

References

Buildings and structures in Mersin Province
Mut District
Open-spandrel deck arch bridges
Bridges completed in the 14th century
Anatolia Beyliks bridges
Stone bridges in Turkey